Redirect and its variants (e.g., redirection) may refer to:

Arts, entertainment, and media
 Redirect, 2012 Christian metal album and its title track by Your Memorial
 Redirected (film), a 2014 action comedy film

Computing
 ICMP Redirect Message, a mechanism for routers to convey routing information to hosts
 Redirection (computing), a capability of command-line interpreters
 URL redirection, a mechanism for making a web page available under more than one address

Law
 Redirect examination, a trial process in law

See also
 
 
 Direct (disambiguation)
 Redirector (disambiguation)